Igor Valentinovich Varlamov (12 August 1971 – 25 September 2022) was a Russian professional footballer who played as a defender.

Club career
Varlamov made his debut in the Russian Premier League in 1992 for Dynamo Moscow. He played four games in the 1992–93 UEFA Cup for Dynamo Moscow.

Honours
 Russian Premier League bronze: 1992, 1993

References

External links
 

1971 births
2022 deaths
Soviet footballers
Footballers from Yaroslavl
Russian footballers
Association football defenders
Soviet Union under-21 international footballers
Russia under-21 international footballers
FC Dynamo Moscow players
Russian Premier League players
FC Chernomorets Novorossiysk players
FC Tyumen players
FC Lokomotiv Nizhny Novgorod players
FC Anzhi Makhachkala players
PFC Spartak Nalchik players
FC Torpedo Vladimir players